The following is a list of some of the more well known caves and caverns in New Zealand.

Not all caves have an official name as set by the New Zealand Geographic Board. The national caving association maintains maps of all known surveyed caves and the name is generally allocated by the group who first discovered the cave.

North Island caves
Many lava tubes and lava caves in the Auckland volcanic field, including:
Rangitoto lava caves
Wiri Lava Cave
Waitomo district:
Aranui Cave
Gardner's Gut
Ruakuri Cave
Waitomo Cave

South Island caves
Broken River Cave 
Cathedral Caves
Cave Stream
Clifden Limestone Caves
Honeycomb Hill Cave
Metro Cave / Te Ananui Cave
Mount Arthur caves:
Ellis Basin cave system
Nettlebed Cave
Moncks Cave
Mount Owen caves:
Bohemia Cave
Bulmer Cavern
Rawhiti Cave
Riwaka Resurgence
Tākaka Hill caves:
Harwood Hole
Ngārua Caves
Te Ana-au Caves
Aurora Cave

See also
List of caves
List of rock formations of New Zealand
 Speleology

References

External links
List of New Zealand's longest cave systems

 
New Zealand, List of caves in
Caves in New Zealand
Caves

de:Liste von Höhlen#Neuseeland